The Canton of Bricquebec-en-Cotentin (before March 2020: canton of Bricquebec) in France is situated in the department of Manche and the region of Normandy. Its seat is in Bricquebec-en-Cotentin. At the French canton reorganisation which came into effect in March 2015, the canton was expanded from 14 to 33 communes (6 of which merged into the new commune Bricquebec-en-Cotentin):

Besneville
Biniville
La Bonneville
Breuville
Bricquebec-en-Cotentin
Catteville
Colomby
Crosville-sur-Douve
L'Étang-Bertrand
Étienville
Golleville
Hautteville-Bocage
Magneville
Morville 
Négreville
Néhou
Neuville-en-Beaumont
Orglandes
Rauville-la-Bigot
Rauville-la-Place
Reigneville-Bocage
Rocheville
Sainte-Colombe
Saint-Jacques-de-Néhou
Saint-Sauveur-le-Vicomte
Sottevast
Taillepied

References

Bricquebec